Wôlinak is an Abenaki First Nations reserve in the Centre-du-Québec region, Quebec, Canada.  An enclave within the city of Bécancour, it was one of the Seven Nations of Canada.

History

Around 1600, a few Abenaki families and Sokokis families established themselves on the Puante river (name given after a battle with the English colonists against the French colonists) which later, was given the name of Bécancour River from the name of M. de Bécancour, Baron de Portneuf, who was also established there.

From 600 inhabitants in the beginning, their numbers diminished after wars and epidemics.

See also
Odanak
Western Abenaki
Seven Nations of Canada

References

External links
Waban-Aki Nation, Quebec
Map of Wôlinak (Google Maps)

Indian reserves in Quebec
Communities in Centre-du-Québec
Abenaki communities